Camp Lake (located at ) is a small snow-melt and rain-fed lake that feeds into the Blue Lake watershed on Baranof Island in the Alexander Archipelago in the Alaskan Panhandle.  Camp Lake is a popular destination for the first night on the Baranof Cross-Island Trail due to its surrounding alpine meadow and the beautifully clear nature of the lake.  Camp Lake sits between Bear Mountain and Mount Bassie and atop a small headwall on the Medvejie Lake valley, although the lake drains into the Blue Lake watershed.  Departing from the Medvejie Hatchery, the trail to Camp Lake spans approximately 3.33 miles (5.4 km) but requires considerable effort due to the difficult terrain and, in certain sections, dense vegetation.

Camp Lake is not named on USGS maps.  In his book on hunting, Les Yaw names the lake "Camper's Lake".

Images

References

Lakes of Alaska
Lakes of Sitka, Alaska